Chornomorets is a Ukrainian toponymical term with reference to Black Sea.

Chornomorets may also refer to:
 FC Chornomorets Odesa, a football club from Odessa
 FC Chornomorets-2 Odesa, a former reserve team of FC Chornomorets Odesa
 Chornomorets Stadium
 Chornomorets, a former Zaporizhian Cossack, member of the Black Sea Host
Oleksandr Chornomorets (born 1993), Ukrainian footballer

See also
 Chernomorets (disambiguation)

Ukrainian words and phrases